Doc – Nelle tue mani (in English, "Doc – In your hands") is an Italian medical drama TV series broadcast on Rai 1 since February 2020, written by Francesco Arlanch and Viola Rispoli.

Season 1 was directed by Jan Maria Michelini and Ciro Visco, while season 2 by Beniamino Catena and Giacomo Martelli.

The series is inspired by doctor Pierdante Piccioni, former chief of the emergency room of Lodi and Codogno, who forgot the previous 12 years of his life following a car accident.

The set is the fictional "Policlinico Ambrosiano" hospital of Milan and the plot concerns the doctors working in the internal medicine department.

Plot

Season 1 
Professor Andrea Fanti is a brilliant and famous doctor working at the Policlinico Ambrosiano hospital of Milan, where he is the chief of the internal medicine department. At the same time he is also arrogant, painstaking and narcissist.

Fanti thinks that doctors should not trust patients, as they lie. Consequently, he only follows his instinct and trusts his team, especially his assistant Giulia Giordano, a doctor he has a secret relationship with.

One day, the father of Giovanni Pavesi, a young boy died in Fanti's ward following a mistake (he was given the wrong medicine, the Satonal, due to a homonymy error), waits for Fanti ending his shift at the hospital and shoots him in the head. Despite the doctor does not die, he suffers from an irreversible prefrontal trauma, which causes him to forget the previous 12 years. Indeed, when Fanti wakes up from coma, he believes that it is June 2008 instead of 2020 and his last memory is him coming home after signing his first contract with the Policlinico Ambrosiano. Forgetting most of the staff he used to work with, he turns from an authoritative doctor into a patient of the hospital.

Thrown into a present he sometimes struggles to understand, obliged to start over most of his life and to deal with relevant trauma like his child's death and the separation from his wife (which he forgot), he perceives his loved ones as strangers. As a consequence, the hospital becomes the only place where Andrea feels really home and where he can try to build a new private and working future.

No more able to be the chief of the department he used to be in charge of, he comes back to work as a "doctor with limitations", that is a kind of assistant for young residents, who nickname him Doc, and uses empathy to interact with patients and help solve their medical issues. In the meantime, he starts a psychological journey with doctor Sardoni, a longtime friend and colleague of his.

Season 2 
Set in an unspecified future, COVID-19 critical stage has ended and the Policlinico Ambrosiano comes back to normal activity.

Several flashbacks allow to understand what happened during the acute phase of the COVID-19 pandemic in Italy. Many warns were converted to face the emergency, including the internal medicine department. However, the hospital had limited resources and people to cope with thousands of patients in a very short time, so, once the emergency ends, the high number of dead doctors and patients leads to an investigation by both the Italian Magistrates' court and the hospital itself, involving all the medical staff, medical director Agnese Tiberi, Andrea Fanti and his team.

Among the victims of COVID-19, there is Lorenzo Lazzarini, a member of Fanti's team later identified as the patient zero, the one who unintentionally introduced the virus in the Policlinico: only his colleagues know the truth about him being the index case and they keep the secret to honour his memory. However, his death, occurred under unclear circumstances, is also matter of investigation.

In the meantime, Agnese is suspended from her role of director due to the investigation about the department he managed during the pandemic and starts working as a senior doctor in the warn she used to belong to, which doctor Sandri manages. The lawyer Caruso, also chief of the administrative department, is appointed as new medical director with the aim of finding out the truth about how the doctors tackled the pandemic emergency.

At the same time, doctor Cecilia Tedeschi, famous virologist and scholar of infetious diseases, is appointed as chief of the internal medicine department, a vacant role after the imprisonment of professor Sardoni and temporarily held by doctor Giordano during the pandemic. Tedeschi is also a former Agnese and Andrea's university mate and was once in love with Andrea, who did not reciprocate her feelings.

Tedeschi secretly wants to turn the internal medicine department into an infectious diseases department with Caruso's help.

Trying to save his department, keep his team united and protect everyone from the investigation, Andrea decides to get his role of chief of the department back, facing several exams intended to certify his eligibility. While doing so, Andrea also needs to deal with Caruso, who does not want him to manage that department for some unknown reasons.

Episodes

References

2020s Italian television series
Italian medical television series
2020s medical television series